Runnin' Down a Dream is a 2007 documentary film about Tom Petty and the Heartbreakers, directed by Peter Bogdanovich. The 4-hour documentary chronicles the history of the band, from its inception as Mudcrutch, right up to the 30th-anniversary concert in Petty's home town of Gainesville, Florida, on September 21, 2006, at the Stephen C. O'Connell Center, University of Florida. The film features interviews with George Harrison, Eddie Vedder, Stevie Nicks, Dave Grohl, Jeff Lynne, Rick Rubin, Johnny Depp, Jackson Browne and more. Petty's solo career is also touched on, as is his time with The Traveling Wilburys.

The film was commercially released as part of a four-disc box set. The film spanned the first two discs, while the 30th anniversary concert and a CD of rare tracks were the components of the remaining two discs. On October 28, 2008, a two-disc version set of the film, featuring previously unreleased bonus performances, but not the Gainesville concert or audio CD, was released to the public. Runnin' Down a Dream was released on Blu-ray Disc on November 15, 2010.

DVD track listing

Disc 1

"Main Feature DVD (Part 1)"
Gainesville 2006
Elvis
What's in a Name
Mike
Benmont
B.Y.O.F. (Build Your Own Festival)
Fast Forward
Deals
A Broken Bond
Ron & Stan
Tom Petty and the Heartbreakers
Third
Fuel
Howie
Poet

Disc 2

"Main Feature DVD (Part 2)"
Bob Dylan
Strange Coincidences
Scott
The Bottom Line
Steve
John
Round Trip
Rock & Roll Heaven
Runnin' Down a Dream (End credits)

Disc 3

"One 30th Anniversary Concert DVD"
"Listen to Her Heart" (Tom Petty)
"Mary Jane's Last Dance" (Tom Petty)
"I Won't Back Down" (Tom Petty, Jeff Lynne)
"Free Fallin'" (Tom Petty, Jeff Lynne)
"Saving Grace" (Tom Petty)
"I'm a Man" (Ellas McDaniel, Koko Taylor)
"Oh Well" (Peter Green)
"Handle with Care" (Bob Dylan, George Harrison, Jeff Lynne, Roy Orbison, Tom Petty)
"Stop Draggin' My Heart Around" (with Stevie Nicks) (Tom Petty, Mike Campbell)
"I Need to Know" (with Stevie Nicks) (Tom Petty)
"It's Good to Be King" (Tom Petty)
"Down South" (Tom Petty)
"Southern Accents" (Tom Petty)
"Insider" (with Stevie Nicks) (Tom Petty)
"Learning to Fly" (Tom Petty, Jeff Lynne)
"Don't Come Around Here No More" (Tom Petty, Dave Stewart)
"Runnin' Down a Dream" (Tom Petty, Jeff Lynne, Mike Campbell)
"You Wreck Me" (Tom Petty, Mike Campbell)
"Mystic Eyes" (Van Morrison)
"American Girl" (Tom Petty)

Disc 4

"Bonus Soundtrack CD"
"Breakdown" (Tom Petty) – Rehearsal 1977, Los Angeles, CA
"Anything That's Rock 'n' Roll" (Tom Petty) – Top Of The Pops, UK, June 16, 1977
"Fooled Again (I Don't Like It)" (Tom Petty) – Old Grey Whistle Test, UK, June 20, 1978
"American Girl" (Tom Petty) – Fridays, June 6, 1980
"Shadow of a Doubt (A Complex Kid)" (Tom Petty) – Fridays, June 6, 1980
"Stories We Could Tell" (John Sebastian) – Recorded at the Record Plant, Hollywood, CA, 1982
"Keeping Me Alive" (Tom Petty) – Recorded at the Record Plant, Hollywood, CA, 1982
"Honey Bee" (Tom Petty) – Saturday Night Live, November 19, 1994
"Lost Highway" (Leon Payne) – Rehearsal at CenterStaging, Burbank, CA, May 19, 2006

Reception
The film received mostly positive feedback from film critics. The film won a Grammy for Best Music Film. The review aggregation website Rotten Tomatoes reports that 100% of critics gave the film a positive review based on 5 reviews, with an average score of 8.1/10. Nick Schager of Slant Magazine reviewed the documentary saying, "Employs a warm and leisurely, though never sluggish, pace that's upfront about Bogdanovich's intention to take his sweet time tackling every topic of relevant interest." Ronnie Schreib of Variety, reviewed it saying: "A feast for Petty fans and a joyous confirmation of the vitality of the collective creative process we." Dan Lybarger, of eFilmCritic.com, said: "Peter Bogdanovich's new documentary about the life and career of Florida-born rocker Tom Petty runs nearly four hours and never fails to engage or entertain."

Personnel
Tom Petty – vocals, guitar, percussion (on Disc 3, track 6)
Mike Campbell – guitar
Benmont Tench – keyboards, backing vocals
Ron Blair – bass, backing vocals (on Disc 3, and Disc 4, tracks 1–5 & 9)
Scott Thurston – guitar, synthesizer, harmonica, vocals (on Disc 3, and Disc 4, tracks 8 & 9)
Steve Ferrone – drums, percussion (on Disc 3, and Disc 4, track 9)
Stevie Nicks – vocals, tambourine on "Stop Draggin' My Heart Around", "I Need to Know", "Insider", "Learning to Fly", "Don't Come Around Here No More" and "American Girl" (on Disc 3)
Howie Epstein – bass, backing vocals (on Disc 4, tracks 6–8)
Stan Lynch – drums, percussion, backing vocals (on Disc 4, tracks 1–7)
Phil Jones – percussion (on Disc 4, tracks 6 & 7)
Dave Grohl – drums (on Disc 4, track 8)

References

External links
MSN Movies
 
 
 

2007 films
Films directed by Peter Bogdanovich
Grammy Award for Best Long Form Music Video
Rockumentaries
Tom Petty live albums
2007 live albums
Live video albums
Tom Petty video albums
2000s English-language films